Chilibeyevo (Siläbey) is a rural locality (a village) in Kaleginsky Selsoviet, Kaltasinsky District, Bashkortostan, Russia. The population was 113 as of 2010. There is 1 street.

Geography 
Chilibeyevo is located 29 km northwest of Kaltasy (the district's administrative centre) by road. Norkino is the nearest rural locality.

References 

Rural localities in Kaltasinsky District